The shrine of Hussain Tekri was built in the 19th century by Mohammad Iftikhar Ali Khan Bahadur, the Nawab of Jaora. It is situated on the outskirts of the town of Jaora in the Ratlam district of Malwa region of Madhya Pradesh, India.

Mohammad Iftikhar Ali Khan Bahadur was buried in the same graveyard where Hussain Tekri is built. During the month of Muharram, thousands of people visit the shrines of Imam Hussain here, which is a replica of the ones in Iraq. The shrine is known for Hazri rituals intended to cure mental ailments.

An unsubstantiated story tells that one night a horse rider were seen at the site of the future shrine; and the riders were said to be the souls of martyrs killed in the Battle of Karbala. It is also believed that a water pond was also created overnight, which never existed before. Barelvis, Shia, Sunnis, and Hindus visit the shrine to get relief from jinns, ghosts and demons, believing that all such creatures ultimately surrender before the shrine and leave the bodies of the victims.
 
This place has a long history of curing people believed to be incurably ill. It has 6 shrines in its vicinity. From the entrance, Fatima Al Zehra (daughter of Mohammed), Imam Al-Hussain (son of Ali), Zainab (daughter of Ali), Al-Abbas (son of Ali), Sakina (daughter of Imam Hussain) and Imam Al-Ali (son of Abu Talib and cousin, son-in-law of Mohammed).

Nawab Mohammad Iftikhar Ali Khan Bahadur, Nawab Unman Ali Khan and his younger brother Nawab Usman Ali Khan Tomb are buried in the shrine of Imam Hussain in Hussain Tekri.

External links
Twelve killed in stampede at Hussain Tekri in Jaora
Ratlam official site

History of Malwa
History of Madhya Pradesh
Ziyarat
Sufi shrines in India
Ratlam
Buildings and structures in Madhya Pradesh